The Admiral of the Narrow Seas also known as the Admiral for the guard of the Narrow Seas  was a senior Royal Navy appointment. The post holder was chiefly responsible for the command of the English navy's Narrow Seas Squadron  also known as the Eastern Squadron  that operated in the two seas which lay between England and Kingdom of France (the English Channel particularly the Straits of Dover) and England and the Spanish Netherlands later the Dutch Republic (the southern North Sea) from 1412 to 1688.  His subordinate units, establishments, and staff were sometimes informally known as the Command of the Narrow Seas.

History 
The first royal commission as Admiral to a naval officer was granted in 1303. By 1344 it was only used as a rank at sea for a captain in charge of a fleet or fleets. 

In the fifteenth, sixteenth and seventeenth centuries, the Kingdom of England claimed sovereignty over certain bodies of water close to the British Isles:  those between the Kingdom of France and England (the English Channel particularly the Straits of Dover) and the Spanish Netherlands later the Dutch Republic and England (the southern North Sea). As a result of England's claim of these territorial waters there was an enforceable requirement placed on any foreign ships passing through the area to acknowledge all English warships. England also exercised control over all fishing rights within the same waters.  

Among the most important naval postings during these times was the Admiral of the Narrow Seas, sometimes called the Vice-Admiral of the Narrow Seas to denote that he was junior to the Lord Admiral of England. These flag officers were formally appointed by the crown. His responsibilities were to guard the narrow seas from foreign threats, protect English fishing vessels and enforce English sovereignty over said waters. 

Claims to the narrow seas lasted until the United Kingdom of Great Britain and Ireland, along with other European countries, agreed to set a new three-mile limit in 1822.

Office holders

See also
Admiral of the South, North and West
Admiral of the West
Admiral of the North
Admiral of the North and West
Battle of the Narrow Seas

References
Citations

Sources
 Baumber, Michael (1989). General-at-sea : Robert Blake and the seventeenth-century revolution in naval warfare (1. publ. ed.). London: J. Murray.  .
 Bruce, John; Hamilton, William Douglas; Lomas, Mrs Sophia Crawford (1865). Calendar of State Papers, Domestic Series, of the Reign of Charles I ...: 1635. Longman, Brown, Green, Longmans, & Roberts.
 Campbell, John (1812). Lives of the British Admirals: Containing Also a New and Accurate Naval History, from the Earliest Periods. London, England: C. J. Barrinton.
Charnock, John (1794). Biographia navalis; or, Impartial memoirs of the lives ... of officers of the navy of Great Britain from ... 1660. London, England: R. Faulder.
  Childs, David (2014). Pirate Nation: Elizabeth I and her Royal Sea Rovers. Barnsley, England: Seaforth Publishing. 

 Fulton, Thomas Wemyss (2002). The Sovereignty of the Sea: An Historical Account of the Claims of England to the Dominion of the British Seas, and of the Evolution of the Territorial Waters, with Special Reference to the Rights of Fishing and the Naval Salute. The Lawbook Exchange, Ltd. 
Keeler, Mary Frear; Cole, Maija Jansson; Bidwell, William B. (1997). Commons Debates 1628. Boydell & Brewer. 
  Humble, Richard (1986). "Four Centuries of Sea Power 1509 to 1919". The rise and fall of the British Navy (1. publ. ed.). London: Macdonald Queen Anne Press. 
 Knighton, Dr C. S.; Loades, Professor David (2013). The Navy of Edward VI and Mary I. Ashgate Publishing, Ltd. .
 Laughton, John Knox. "Warde Luke". Dictionary of National Biography, 1885–1900. Wikisource. Retrieved 6 June 2018.
 Luke, John (1958). Tangier at High Tide: The Journal of John Luke, 1670–1673. Librairie Droz. .
 "Narrow Seas - Oxford Reference - in The Oxford Companion to Ships and the Sea". oxfordreference.com. University of Oxford. 
 Nichols, John (2013). John Nichols's The Progresses and Public Processions of Queen Elizabeth: Volume III: 1579 to 1595. Oxford, England: OUP Oxford.  
 Stewart, William (2009). Admirals of the World: A Biographical Dictionary, 1500 to the Present. McFarland. .
 Winfield, Rif (2010). British Warships in the Age of Sail 1603-1714: Design, Construction, Careers and Fates. Barnsley, England: Seaforth Publishing. 

Admiral of the Narrow Seas
1412 establishments in England
1688 disestablishments in England
Military history of the English Channel